Adolphe Roehn (March 5, 1780 – October 19, 1867) was a French painter, draughtsman, and lithographer.

Roehn exhibited his work in the Paris Salon from 1799 to 1866, winning a second class medal in 1819. Between 1802 and 1814, under the direction of Baron Vivant Denon, the director of the Louvre, he created a series of drawings illustrating Napoleon's campaigns in Italy. After the bloody Battle of Eylau in 1807, Vivant Denon held a propaganda contest requiring entrants depict a certain scene from the event. Roehn received a "gold medal of encouragement" (the winning entry was Napoléon on the Battlefield of Eylau by Antoine-Jean Gros).

Like his son, Jean Alphonse Roehn, he taught drawing at the Louis-Legrand School.

Gallery

References

External links 

 Roehn's works in the Louvre 
 Roehn's works in the British Museum

1780 births
1867 deaths
19th-century French painters
Painters from Paris